Lokoja is a city in Nigeria. It lies at the confluence of the Niger and Benue rivers and is the capital city of Kogi State. While the Yoruba (Oworo), Bassa Nge and Nupe are indigenous to the area, other ethnic groups of Nigeria, including the Kupa-Nupe, Hausa, Ebira, Igala, Igbo, Bini/Edo, and Tiv have recently established themselves.  Projected to be the third fastest growing African continent city between 2020 and 2025, with a 5.93% growth. It was listed a second class township by the 1917 township ordinance of the colonial administration. This shows that Lokoja is an old city.

Etymology
Different ethnic groups lay claim to having named the city.

 The Yoruba ( Oworo ) people believe the name comes from Ilu Oke Oja ("The settlement located on the hill did not fall").
 The Hausa believe the name comes from Loko Ja ("A red corner") and that the city was named by the emir of Zazzau.
 The Nupe believe the name comes from Patti Lukongi ("The hill of doves").
 The Igala believe the name comes from the expression Lewa ka je Eja (Come, let's eat fish).

History
The area that would become Lokoja has been inhabited for hundreds of years by people from different ethnic groups prior to the arrival of Europeans. The migrations of these groups to the area could be in part accounted for by its nearness to the banks of the Niger and Benue rivers. Some of the first groups of people to settle in Lokoja were the Oworo people/Yoruba from Ile-Ife, Hausa and Nupe. It is said that they migrated from Baro and some parts of present-day Niger State to the confluence of the Niger and Benue rivers. This area eventually became a center of trade. Example are the Kupas and some of the Kakandas.

The Nupe and Zazzau emirs historically appointed the Hausas as political leaders, while the Nupe filled the position of religious leader as chief imam of Lokoja. Lokoja was ruled by the following Maigari of Lokoja (Hamza, Dauda, Musa, Muhammadu Maikarfi). The British then installed a Muslim convert called Bukar (originally named Abigel), who designated his residence at Yaragi Madabo Junction of Lokoja as the new Lokoja palace. In time, the position fell to Alhaji Yahaya Muhammadu Maikarfi, and after his demise, Alhaji Kabiru, his son, succeeded him. The people sustained themselves by engaging in farming and hunting activities at Agbaja hill. Lokoja has an abundance of hills which were popular for hunting. At Mount Patti ("Patti" being the Nupe word for hill), there is a tree where the names of hunters were recorded in Ajami and Latin script. 
When Dr William Balfour Baikie arrived at Lokoja first in 1854 and later in 1857, he played a role in encouraging the outward movement of the people from their hilly settlements. He did this by influencing Muhammadu Maikarfi, then the Maigari of Lokoja. Muhammudu Maikarfi was then succeeded by Abigel (who converted to Islam and was renamed Bukar), who was widely seen as a stooge of the British.

The Bassa-Nges believe that they settled at the foot of Mount Patti when they came into Lokoja, before later moving again and migrating to settle across the Benue, just to the north of the Igalas. Whatever the case may be, it is difficult to categorically state in what order any or each of these groups came after the Oworos to settle in Lokoja town. These different groups lived in different quarters of the town but were closely related socio-politically. They interacted freely and tolerated one another. Present day Lokoja is ruled by the Maigari (chief) of Lokoja, and his 12 Hakimi (Sub chiefs) It is important to note however, that each group have their own local criteria: for example, the Maigari has no jurisdiction over the Olu of Oworo, but he does have authority over Ganaja, Kwakware, Sarkin Numa, Adankolo, ward A to ward E and other villages of the Lokoja Holland that is the Salkawa people.

The present modern settlement at Lokoja was established in 1857 by the British explorer William Baikie at the site of an earlier model farm constructed during the failed Niger expedition of 1841. Lokoja was the capital of the British Northern Nigeria Protectorate and the chief of Lokoja at that time was Alhaji Muhammadu Maikarfi. Lokoja remained a convenient administrative town for the British colonial government after the amalgamation of Northern and Southern Nigeria in 1914. The first Governor-General, Sir Frederick Lugard, governed the new nation of Nigeria from Lokoja. Other subsequent settlers into the city include the Yoruba (mainstream), the Igala, the Igbira (Igbira Tao and Igbira Koto), and the Bassa-Nge people. However, there are other groups apart from the ones mentioned above but they are classified as temporary visitors and non indigenous. These include the Igbo, Tiv, Edo, etc.

The city's population has since grown to an estimated count of over 90,000 inhabitants. It is a trade center with respect to its agricultural products; this is because it is situated at the confluence of the Niger and Benue rivers, and is close to the federal capital of Nigeria in Abuja. It is also home to Kogi State Polytechnic and the newly established Federal University Lokoja.

Near Lokoja, in Ajaokuta, are metallurgy facilities and iron ore mines.

The Local Government Area
Lokoja is also a Local Government Area of Kogi State with an area of 3,180 km2 and a population of 195,261 at the 2006 census. It is bounded by the Niger in the north and east upstream from the capital until the border with Kwara State, and includes the city of Lokoja. The postal code of the area is 260.

Climate

Geography

Lokoja lies about 7.8023° North of the equator and 6.7333° E east of the Meridian. It is about 165 km Southwest of Abuja as the crow flies, and 390 km Northeast of Lagos by same measure. Residential districts are of varying density, and the city has various suburbs such as Felele, Adankolo, Otokiti and Ganaja. The town is situated in the tropical Wet and Dry savanna climate zone of Nigeria, and temperatures remain hot year-round.

Religion and culture
Given the multiethnic nature of the town, there are various festivals, events and socio-cultural activities depending on the people group. Thus, no particular group's festivals or their socio-cultural activities can be said to be the most prominent. For instance, the Agbo masquerade festival is celebrated by the Oworo people between the months of March and April every year. Other Okuns also celebrate the Oro / Egungun festival while generally, the fishermen in Lokoja celebrate the Donkwo fishing festival and this also comes up in March/April. It is also worthy to mention that editions of Lokoja boat regatta are held, albeit not regularly.

Religiously, Islam, Christianity and traditional religion exist in Lokoja. The Muslims go to their mosques for their worship while the Christians do the same in their various churches. Religious festivals include the Muslim Eids and the Christian Christmas and Easter.

Markets

Lokoja has three major markets: New Market (International Market); Old Market; and Kpata Market. Kpata Market and New Market have their market day every Five Days. The essential products sold in these markets are grains, vegetables and general household items.

References

External links

State capitals in Nigeria
Benue River
Communities on the Niger River
Local Government Areas in Kogi State
1857 establishments in Africa
Populated places established in 1857